Wakeley is a hamlet and former civil parish  from Hertford, now in the parish of Westmill, in the East Hertfordshire district, in the county of Hertfordshire, England. In 1881 the parish had a population of 10.

History 
The name "Wakeley" means 'Waca's wood/clearing'. Wakeley was recorded in the Domesday Book as Wachelei. "Wakely" is recorded as an alternative name for "Wakeley. The surname Wakeley derives from the village. Wakeley was an extra-parochial tract, in 1858 it became a separate civil parish, on 25 March 1883 the parish was abolished and merged with Westmill. Wakeley is a deserted medieval village which once had a church.

References 

Hamlets in Hertfordshire
Former civil parishes in Hertfordshire
East Hertfordshire District